is a sound  artist, sound designer, and independent filmmaker. He is a director of the ethnographic media production label Concrete. Morinaga specializes in recording and documenting the music of different parts of the world and has published a number of recordings. By using the recording materials, Morinaga creates and produces installations, audiovisual works and the performances.

Morinaga works as a sound designer and music director for the feature films, documentaries, performing arts, cooperate installations, collaborating with artists and the companies around the world. Morinaga often gives workshop and series of lecture for sound in different disciplines at different institutions, universities and the public spaces.

Media performances
 Setan Jawa (2019) 
 Gong ex Machina (2018)
 Marginal gongs (2016)
 Message from a Medicine Man (2016) 
 A Widow in Batavia (2015)
 Irpinia Soundscape Italy (2011) 
 Invisible Cities Italy (2011)

Installations
 2020: POLLINATORS -4ch multi screen+3D sound installation (Saitama Triennale 2020, Japan)
 2019: Lab in the forest with Ayoro Laboratory + Naoki Ishikawa  (Tobiu Art Festival, Japan)
 2019: R for Resonance with Ho Tzu Nyen (Sharjah biennale, UAE)
 2017: Light and Sound on the Planet with Naoki Ishikawa (Ichihara Lakeside Museum, Japan)
 2017: Critical Dictionary of Southeast Asia with Ho Tzu Nyen (Singapore)
 2016: Aomori EARTH2016- Roots and Routes (Aomori Museum of Art, Japan)
 2016: Trading Garden (Sound&City, Ark Hills Roppongi Tokyo, Japan)
 2015: Aomori EARTH2015- To the Heart of the Unknown Trail (Aomori Museum of Art, Japan)
 2011: Cloud of Unknowing with Ho Tzu Nyen (Singapore Pavilion at Biennale di Venezia, Italy)
 2010: Sony contemplating Monolithic Design (Salone Internazionale del Mobile, Italy) 
 2010: Heaven Hell with Chris Chong Chan Fui (Future Projection at Toronto International Film Festival, Canada) 
 2010: A Ripe Volcano with Taiki Sakpisit (Rotterdam International Film Festival, Holland)

Filmography (sound designer and music director)
 2020: Edge of Daybreak (Dir: Taiki Sakipisit, Thailand) FIPRESCI Award, International Film Festival Rotterdam 2021
 2019: Science of Fictions (Dir: Yosep Anggi Noen, Indonesia)  Special Mention Award,  Locarno Film Festival 2019
 2018: The Seen and Unseen (Dir: Kamila Andini, Indonesia) Grand Prix of the Generation KPlus International Jury - Berlinale 2018
 2017: Mawari Kagura (Dir: Mirai Osawa, Japan)
 2016: Uzu (Dir: Gaspard Kuentz, France&Japan)
 2016: Anastasis (Dir: Faozan Rizal, Tony Broer, Indonesia) 
 2016: Yamato (California) (Dir: Daisuke Miyazaki, Japan)
 2015: Discovery of the Film - Toshio Matsumoto (Dir: Takefumi Tsutsui, Japan)
 2014: 9/5 (Omnibus Films with Japan, Thailand, Singapore and China)
 2013: The One (Dir: Ichiro Yamamoto, Japan)
 2011: Guilty of Romance (Dir: Sion Sono, Japan)
 2011: A Boy inside the Boy (Dir:Saburo Teshigawara, Japan)
 2010: A Lonely Planet (Dir: Takefumi Tsutsui, Japan)
 2009: Earth (Dir: Ho Tzu Nyen, Singapore) 
 2009: Karaoke (Dir: Chris Chong Chan Fui, Malaysia) 
 2008: Block B (Dir: Chris Chong Chan Fui, Malaysia) 
 2007: A Bao A Qu(Dir: Naoki Kato, Japan)

Contemporary dance and theater (music director)
 2021: A Hai (with Kenta Kojiri)
 2021: Dialogue(with Kenta Kojiri)
 2021: The Threshold (with Kenta Kojiri)
 2020: UrFear as a part of Multitude of Peer Gynts (with Theater GARASI)
 2019: Peer Gynts (with Theater GARASI)
 2019: The Seen and Unseen (with Kamila Andini)
 2018: The extremities of a Surface (with Mandeep Raikhy)
 2018: Medium (with Rianto)
 2017: Self-Portrait ( with Kenta Kojiri)
 2017: Surface & Destroy (with Kenta Kojiri / Yoko Seyama)
 2016: Queen-Size (with Mandeep Raikhy/India)
 2014: To belong -Suwung- (with Akiko Kitamura/Japan and Indonesia)
 2014: Shell (with Kana Ote/Japan)
 2014: 10000 Tigers (with Ho Tzu Nyen/Singapore) 
 2014: Utérus (Foofwa D'Imobilité/Switzerland)
 2013: To belong -cyclonicdream- (with Akiko Kitamura/Japan and Indonesia)
 2013: Male and has a straight antenna (with Mandeep Reikhy/India)
 2012: To belong -dialogue- (with Akiko Kitamura/Japan and Indonesia)

Discography

Archival albums
 2010: Archival Sound Series - Ludwig Karl Koch
 2015: Archival Sound Series - José Maceda 2CDs

Field recordings
 2013: Endah Laras [Surakarta, Indonesia] 
 2014: [[Slamet Gundono]] [Surakarta, Indonesia] 
 2015: He Xiu Dong(Dongba Shaman) [Yunnan, China] 
 2015: He Wei Xiang [Lijiang, China]
 2016: Snake Charmer : Narayan Jogi [Rajasthan, India]
 2022: Exploring Gong Culture of Southeast Asia: [Massif and Archipelago]

Outland ethnologies
 2017: "Lonely Lodger" by Li Jianhong (China)
 2018: "Thang Mo" by Ngoc Dai (Vietnam)
 2021: "Lijiang With/Out & Hokkaido [we are all great parents]" Compilation CD [3CDs + booklets]

Teaching/workshop/seminars
Morinaga has delivered public lectures, workshops and mentorships at universities and organizations. 

 2021: Lecture for musical archive - Tama Art University, Tokyo Japan
 2020: Lecture for field recording & sound design - Master Program in Experimental Workshop, Tama Art University, Tokyo Japan
 2019: Mentorship for the Workshop - Documentary Dojo, Yamagata Prefectue, Japan (Organized by Yamagata International Documentary Film Festival)
 2018: Workshop and Artist in Residence for field-work - Uymam　Project, Hokkaido, Japan (Organized by Tobiu Art community)
 2018: Lecture for sound design - Mumbai Assembly, Mumbai, India (Organized by Japan Foundation India)
 2018: Lecture for sound design - Srishti IInstitute of Art, Design and Technology, Bangalore, India (Organized by Japan Foundation India)
 2018: Lecture for sound design - Satyajit Ray Film & TV Institute, Kolkata, India (Organized by Japan Foundation India)
 2017: DJ- "Light and Voice of the Planet" with Naoki Ishikawa - Niigata City Art Museum, Niigata Prefecture, Japan
 2017: Lecture for the field recording and sound design - Japan Foundation Hanoi, Vietnam (Organized by Japan Foundation Asia Center)
 2017: DJ- "WYST Collective" - Ensembles Asia Orchestra with Yoshihide Otomo - Yogyakarta, Indonesia (Organized by Japan Foundation Asia Center)
 2017: DJ- "Light and Voice of the Planet" with Naoki Ishikawa - Mito Art Museum - ACM Theater, Ibaraki Prefecture, Japan
 2017: Lecture for field recording and sound design - Gunma Prefectural Women's University, Gunma Prefecture, Japan
 2016: Lecture for sound representation - Tokyo Metropolitan University, Tokyo Japan
 2016: Seminar: Field Recording - Sound & City Festival, Ark-Hills Roppongi, Tokyo, Japan (Organized by WIRED Magazine)
 2016: DJ- World Music Night with Keiji Haino and Keiichi Tahara - Ginza Music Bar, Tokyo, Japan
 2016: Lecture for sound representation - Tokyo Metropolitan University, Tokyo Japan
 2015: Workshop for field recording and sonic ethnology - Aomori Museum of Art 
 2015: Workshop: Miyakojima Collective - Ensembles Asia Orchestra with Yoshihide Otomo, Naoki Ishikawa, Keiko Arima (Organized by Japan Foundation Asia Center)
 2014: Lecture for sound design - Chinese University of Hong Kong, Hong Kong
 2013: Workshop for field recording and sound design  - Academia di Belle Art di Napoli, Naples, Italy
 2013: Workshop for sound design  - Chino Cultural Complex, Nagano Prefecture, Japan
 2013: Lecture for sound design - Tokyo Polytechnic University, Tokyo, Japan
 2012: Workshop for sound design - International Web-Art Festival, Pescara, Italy
 2012: Workshop for sound design - Shinshu University, Nagano Prefecture, Japan
 2012: Workshop for sound design - GATI dance forum, New Delhi, India (Organized by Japan Foundation India)
 2012: Lecture for sound design - Tokyo Polytechnic University, Tokyo, Japan
 2009: Initiator for the International Conference for the sound and moving images "SOUND CONTINUUM" (funded by the Ministry of Cultural Affairs)

References

External links
 
Bits Lounge (Toronto Web Informational magazine), Interview
A Lonely Planet (Special interview for A Lonely Planet) 
Sonic Haiku And Invisible Cities. Yasuhiro Morinaga’s Sound Design 

1980 births
Japanese composers
Japanese male composers
Living people
Musicians from Tokyo